Michael Lee McDaniel (born March 6, 1983) is an American football coach who is the head coach for the Miami Dolphins of the National Football League (NFL). A former long-time assistant to Mike and Kyle Shanahan, McDaniel began his NFL coaching career as an intern for the Denver Broncos in 2005. McDaniel served as an assistant coach for the Houston Texans, Washington Redskins, Cleveland Browns, Atlanta Falcons, and San Francisco 49ers from 2017 to 2021, holding his first offensive coordinator position in 2021. McDaniel has appeared in two Super Bowls, first with the Falcons in 2017 then with the 49ers in 2020. 

McDaniel spent five seasons with the 49ers, mostly as the run game coordinator. His tenure concluded with their second NFC Championship Game appearance in three seasons; McDaniel served as the offensive coordinator that season before he left to become the Dolphins' head coach.

Early life and playing career
McDaniel was born in Aurora, Colorado (where he became best friends with comedian Dan Soder) in 1983. He graduated from Smoky Hill High School in 2001. He played college football as a wide receiver at Yale, where he graduated with a degree in history.

Coaching career

Denver Broncos
McDaniel was hired in 2005, at the age of 22 by his hometown Denver Broncos as a coaching intern under head coach Mike Shanahan. The Broncos in 2005 finished with what was at the time their best record since John Elway's retirement six years earlier, at 13-3. In the postseason, they defeated the defending back-to-back Super Bowl champion New England Patriots 27-13 in the Divisional Round before falling to the eventual Super Bowl champion Pittsburgh Steelers 34-17 in the AFC Championship Game.

Houston Texans
In 2006, McDaniel was hired by the Houston Texans as an offensive assistant under head coach Gary Kubiak, whom McDaniel worked alongside at the Denver Broncos a season earlier. During his tenure in Houston, McDaniel assisted three different offensive coordinators and future head coaches; Troy Calhoun, Mike Sherman, and Kyle Shanahan.

California Redwoods / Sacramento Mountain Lions
In 2009, McDaniel was hired by the California Redwoods, a team from the now-defunct UFL football league as a running backs coach under former Minnesota Vikings/Arizona Cardinals head coach Dennis Green. In McDaniel's second year, the team relocated to Sacramento and was subsequently renamed the Sacramento Mountain Lions.

Washington Redskins
In 2011, McDaniel was hired by the Washington Redskins as an offensive assistant, reuniting with Redskins head coach Mike Shanahan, who was McDaniel's mentor six seasons earlier on the Denver Broncos. It was there where McDaniel worked alongside three other future head coaches: Kyle Shanahan, Sean McVay, and Matt LaFleur. In 2013, McDaniel was promoted to wide receivers coach following the departure of Ike Hilliard, who left to join the Buffalo Bills in the same position. McDaniel would not be retained under new head coach Jay Gruden.

Cleveland Browns
McDaniel was hired in 2014 by the Cleveland Browns as their wide receivers coach under new head coach Mike Pettine.

Atlanta Falcons
McDaniel was hired by the Atlanta Falcons as an offensive assistant coach under new head coach Dan Quinn in 2015.

San Francisco 49ers
In 2017, McDaniel was hired by the San Francisco 49ers as their run game coordinator under his long-time associate and new head coach Kyle Shanahan, whom he worked alongside for a total of nine seasons on the Texans, Redskins, Browns, and Falcons. During the 2019 season, McDaniel and the Niners appeared in Super Bowl LIV, where they lost to the Kansas City Chiefs 31-20. On January 18, 2021, McDaniel was promoted to offensive coordinator, following the departure of passing game coordinator Mike LaFleur, who left to become the offensive coordinator for the New York Jets.

Miami Dolphins
The Miami Dolphins hired McDaniel as their fourteenth head coach on February 6, 2022. On September 11, 2022, McDaniel made his regular season head coaching debut against the New England Patriots and led the Dolphins to a 20-7 victory, marking McDaniel's first victory as a head coach. McDaniel became the first Dolphins head coach since Nick Saban in 2005 to win his first game as Miami's head coach, and the first in franchise history to win a season opener as a rookie head coach.
McDaniel also helped the Dolphins defeat the Bills for the first time since the 2018 season.

McDaniel led the Dolphins to a 9-8 record, giving Miami their first playoff berth since 2016. The Dolphins fell to the Bills 34-31 despite a late rally in the fourth quarter of the Wild Card Round.

Personal life
McDaniel and his wife Katie have one daughter.

McDaniel is multiracial. His mother is white and his father is black. In February 2022, McDaniel said some family members from his mother's side cut ties with him over his father's race.

McDaniel grew up close friends with comedian Dan Soder in Aurora, Colorado.

Head coaching record

References

External links

 Coaching statistics at Pro-Football-Reference.com
 Miami Dolphins bio
California Redwoods bio

1983 births
Living people
Atlanta Falcons coaches
Cleveland Browns coaches
Denver Broncos coaches
Houston Texans coaches
Miami Dolphins head coaches
National Football League offensive coordinators
People from Aurora, Colorado
People from Colorado
Sacramento Mountain Lions coaches
San Francisco 49ers coaches
Sportspeople from Aurora, Colorado
Sportspeople from Colorado
Washington Redskins coaches